Meykhvosh (also Romanized as Meykhowsh); also known as Markhash and Sīkhowsh) is a village in Ojarud-e Sharqi Rural District, Muran District, Germi County, Ardabil Province, Iran. At the 2006 census, its population was 163, in 33 families.

Meykhvosh is about 4 km south of Zahra, the capital of Muran District. Zahra is 30 km east of Germi. Meykhvosh and Zahra are close (one km) to border of Azerbaijan Republic. The inhabitants speak Azerbaijani language.

References 

Tageo

Meykhvosh is a village in the Ardabil Province of Iran.

Towns and villages in Germi County